Hulhumalé Mosque (formal name:  Masjid al Sheikh Qasim bin Al-Thani) is a mosque in Hulhumalé, Maldives opened in the 1990s in the framework of the Hulhumalé land reclamation and development project, accommodating more than 1500 worshippers.

See also
 Islam in the Maldives

References

Mosques completed in the 1990s
Mosques in the Maldives